was a Japanese author. She graduated from the Department of Japanese Literature of Shōin Joshi Senmon Gakkō (now Osaka Shoin Women's University). Author of numerous novels, she won the Akutagawa Prize, Yomiuri Prize, and Asahi Prize, and received the Order of Culture for her contributions to literature. The honorific nicknamed the L. M. Montgomery of Japan after her death in 2019.

Biography 
Tanabe was born on 27 March 1928. Her father was a photographer and operated a photography studio. She was familiar with the Japanese classic literatures since her young days. The cultures and tradition of her birthplace, Osaka, largely affected her life and literature.

After World War II, she engaged in the coterie activities while working in a company. Her novel Hanagari in this period was nominated in the literature competition and adopted as a radio drama. In 1956, she won the Osaka Citizen Award for literature for her story Niji. After that she became a professional writer.

In 1964, she won the 50th Akutagawa Prize for her novel Sentimental Journey (Kanshō Ryokō). In the following years, she wrote and published a wide range of literary works, such as novels of love romance, biographies, many essays of various themes including Japanese classic literature, translations and adaptations of the classic works of Japan such as the Tale of Genji and Makura no Sōshi.

She married Sumio Kawano who had been a husband of her literary friend Shōko Kawano (川野彰子). After the death of Shōko, Tanabe married Kawano as a second wife in 1966, and lived with him until his death in 2002, for 36 years. They lived in Osaka, but in 1976, they moved to Itami city in Hyōgo Prefecture.

Tanabe received various literary awards. In 2000, she became a Person of Cultural Merit and then, she received Order of Culture for her literary contributions of Japanese culture in 2008. Her literary works had unique characteristics which reflected the cultures of Osaka and its dialect. She created successful love romances using Osaka dialect, which is one of Kansai dialect.

Tanabe died by ascending cholangitis on 6 June 2019 at a hospital in Kōbe, Hyōgo.

Prizes 
 1956 Osaka Citizen Award, for Niji ( 虹 )
 1964 50th Akutagawa Prize for Kanshō ryokō ( 感傷旅行 )
 1987 Women's Literature Award for Hanagoromo nuguya matsuwaru ... Waga ai no Sugita Hisajo ( 花衣ぬぐやまつわる......わが愛の杉田久女 )
 1993 Yoshikawa Eiji Prize for Literature, for Hinekure Issa ( ひねくれ一茶 )
 1994 42nd Kikuchi Kan Prize, for Hinekure Issa
 1998 26th Izumi Kyōka Prize for Literature, for Dōton-bori no ame ni wakarete irai nari - Senryū sakka Kishimoto Suifu to sono jidai ( 道頓堀の雨に別れて以来なり-川柳作家·岸本水府とその時代 )
 1999 50th Yomiuri Prize for Dōton-bori no ame ni wakarete irai nari
 2007 Asahi Prize

Awards 
 2000 Person of Cultural Merit
 2008 Order of Culture

Selected works

Novels 
Hanakari Touto shobou 1958
Kanshou ryokou (Sentimental journey) Bungeishunjū, 1964 
Amai kankei San-ichi Publishing, 1968
Onna no hidokei Yomiuri Shimbun, 1970
Joze to tora to sakana-tachi Kadokawa Shoten  1985
Fukigenna koibito Kadokawa Shoten, 1988
Hinekure Issa Kodansha, 1992

Essays 
Onna no nagaburo Bungeishunjū, 1973
Eve no okurege Bungeishunjū, 1975 
Raamen nieta mo gozonjinai Shinchosha, 1977 
Rakurōshō 1, 2, 3, 4 Shueisha, 1999, 2007, 2008, 2009

Translations and adaptations of classic Japanese works  
Mae mae, katatsumuri, Shin Ochikubo monogatari Bungeishunjū, 1977
Shin Genji monogatari Shinchosha, 1978–79

Shihon Genji monogatari Jitsugyo no Nihon Sha, 1980

Haru no mezame wa Murasaki no maki, Shin shihon Genji monogatari Jitsugyo no Nihon Sha, 1983
Mukashi akebono, shousetsu Makura no sōshi Kadokawa Shoten, 1983
Tanabe Seiko no Ogura hyakunin isshu Kadokawa Shoten, 1986
Tanabe Seiko no Kojiki Shueisha, Watashi no koten 1986

Kiri fukaki Uji no koi, Shin Genji monogatari Shinchosha, 1990

Biographies 
Hanagoromo nuguya matsuwaru ... Waga ai no Sugita Hisajo Shueisha, 1987
Douton-bori no ame ni wakarete irai nari - Senryuu sakka Kishimoto Suifu to sono jidai Chuokoron-Shinsha, 1998

References

1928 births
2019 deaths
Japanese women novelists
Yomiuri Prize winners
Akutagawa Prize winners
Recipients of the Order of Culture
Writers from Osaka
20th-century Japanese novelists
21st-century Japanese novelists